Xanthocrambus watsoni is a species of moth in the family Crambidae described by Stanisław Błeszyński in 1960. It is found in North Africa, including Morocco and Algeria.

References

Moths described in 1960
Crambinae